Orwell's Roses is a book of biography and literary criticism by Rebecca Solnit on the relation between George Orwell's interest in gardening and his other authorial and political commitments.

References

External links 

 

2021 non-fiction books
Books about George Orwell
Books by Rebecca Solnit
English-language books
Viking Press books